Baron Marie Jules Henri de Castex (12 July 1854 – 17 November 1934) was a French sport shooter who competed in the 1912 Summer Olympics and in the 1920 Summer Olympics. He was born in Molsheim.

In 1912 he was a member of the French team which finished sixth in the team clay pigeons event. In the individual trap competition he finished 29th and in the 30 metre rapid fire pistol he finished 42nd. Eight years later he was part of the French team which finished seventh in the team clay pigeons event.

References

1854 births
1934 deaths
French male sport shooters
Trap and double trap shooters
ISSF pistol shooters
Olympic shooters of France
Shooters at the 1912 Summer Olympics
Shooters at the 1920 Summer Olympics
Barons of France
20th-century French people